Cains Creek (also called Cain Creek) is a stream in Pike County in the U.S. state of Missouri. It is a tributary of Grassy Creek.

Cains Creek was named for the fact cane was an important cash crop in the area.

See also
List of rivers of Missouri

References

Rivers of Pike County, Missouri
Rivers of Missouri